Ed Gray (December 9, 1934 – April 28, 1976) was an All-American and team captain of the 1956 University of Oklahoma football team who played for the Edmonton Eskimos as a defensive end in the Canadian Football League from 1957 to 1962 and was an all-star player for two of those years.

Oklahoma Sooners
In 1955 and 1956, Ed Gray played for Sooner teams that won national championships. In 1956, he was team captain and All-American for a team that went 10-1 and allowed only 89 points on defense.

Edmonton Eskimos
As a member of the Edmonton Eskimos, Ed Gray played defensive end from 1957 to 1962. He played in only 8 games in his first year, but earned a regular spot the following year and from 1958 to 1961 played in all 16 games. Gray was named as a Western conference All-Star in 1959 and 1960. He ended his career in 1962 after playing in 13 games. In his career, he recovered 6 fumbles, 2 of them for touchdowns, and intercepted one pass.

References

1934 births
1976 deaths
American players of Canadian football
Canadian football defensive linemen
Edmonton Elks players
Oklahoma Sooners football players
People from Odessa, Texas